{{DISPLAYTITLE:C10H14N5O8P}}
The molecular formula C10H14N5O8P (molar mass: 363.22 g/mol) may refer to:

 Cyclic pyranopterin monophosphate
 Guanosine monophosphate

Molecular formulas